Modrej (in older sources also Modreja) is a settlement on the right bank of the Soča River, just north of Most na Soči, in the Municipality of Tolmin in the Littoral region of Slovenia.

References

External links

Modrej on Geopedia

Populated places in the Municipality of Tolmin